The 1808 United States presidential election in Pennsylvania took place as part of the 1808 United States presidential election. Voters chose 20 representatives, or electors to the Electoral College, who voted for President and Vice President.

Pennsylvania voted for the Democratic-Republican candidate, James Madison, over the Federalist candidate, Charles Cotesworth Pinckney. Madison won Pennsylvania by a margin of 56.74%.

Results

County results

See also
 List of United States presidential elections in Pennsylvania

References

Pennsylvania
1808
1808 Pennsylvania elections